Sayle may refer to:
Alexei Sayle (born 1952), English stand-up comedian, actor, author and former recording artist
Amy Sayle (1884–1970), British politician and health visitor
Charles Edward Sayle (1864–1924), English Uranian poet, literary scholar and librarian
Darrius Sayle, major character in Snakehead
Desiree Sayle, Deputy Assistant to the President and Director of the USA Freedom Corps for the Bush Administration
Jeff Sayle (born 1954), former Grand Prix motorcycle road racer from Australia
Murray Sayle OAM (1926–2010), Australian journalist, novelist and adventurer
William Sayle (1590–1671), prominent British landholder who was Governor of Bermuda in 1643 and again in 1658

See also

James Sayle Moose or James S. Moose Jr. (1903–1989), was an American diplomat and ambassador to several countries
Robert Sayle, department store located in Cambridge
M. Sayle Taylor (1889–1942), operated a radio advice show on CBS, then NBC and finally on Mutual
Saille
Sayler
Sayles
Seille (disambiguation)
Sáile
Sæle (disambiguation)
Zeyl